James Martin (21 August 1892 – 9 February 1940) was a Scottish footballer who played for Hearts, Dumbarton, Rangers and Portsmouth, mainly as a left half. He won the Scottish Football League championship with Rangers in the 1917–18 season, making 18 appearances (although he also spent time on loan with both Airdrieonians and Morton during that campaign, and the whole of the next at Falkirk). He moved to English football with Portsmouth in 1921 and became a regular and eventually captain at Fratton Park, making over 200 appearances and winning the Football League Third Division South title in 1923–24. After leaving Pompey in 1927, he had short spells at Montrose and Aldershot.

References

1892 births
1940 deaths
Scottish footballers
People from Bo'ness
Footballers from Falkirk (council area)
Dumbarton F.C. players
Bo'ness F.C. players
Rangers F.C. players
Airdrieonians F.C. (1878) players
Falkirk F.C. players
Greenock Morton F.C. players
Aldershot F.C. players
Montrose F.C. players
Heart of Midlothian F.C. players
Portsmouth F.C. players
Scottish Football League players
English Football League players
Association football wing halves